Shady Grove is an unincorporated community in Cherokee County, located in the U.S. state of Texas. According to the Handbook of Texas, the community had a population of 30 in 2000. It is located within the Tyler-Jacksonville combined statistical area.

History
The area in what is known as Shady Grove today may have been settled sometime after the American Civil War. It had a store and a few scattered houses in the 1930s; in 1936, the population was 20. The store closed after World War II ended. The population remained at 20 in 1990 with a church and some scattered houses. It gained 10 people in 2000.

Geography

Education
Shady Grove had its own school in 1896 and had 26 students enrolled. Today, the community is served by the Rusk Independent School District.

Notes

Unincorporated communities in Cherokee County, Texas
Unincorporated communities in Texas